Benjamin Jack Curran (born 7 June 1996) is an English cricketer who plays for Northamptonshire. Curran is a left-handed batsman. He is the son of former Zimbabwean international cricketer Kevin Curran, and the brother of England internationals Tom and Sam Curran. He has previously represented the MCC Young Cricketers, and the Nottinghamshire Second XI.

Curran made his Twenty20 debut for Northamptonshire against Derbyshire on 8 August 2018. He signed with Northamptonshire for the remainder of the 2018 season on 15 August 2018, and made his first-class debut against Durham on 29 August 2018. He made his List A debut on 26 April 2019, for Northamptonshire in the 2019 Royal London One-Day Cup.

Curran was selected to play for the Southern Rocks in the 20/21 and the 201/22 Logan Cup in Zimbabwe, where he grew up.

References

External links
 

1996 births
Living people
English cricketers
Northamptonshire cricketers
Cricketers from Northampton
Ben
English people of Zimbabwean descent
Southern Rocks cricketers